Leninsk is a town and the administrative center of Leninsky District in Volgograd Oblast, Russia, located on the left bank of the Akhtuba River,  east of Volgograd, the administrative center of the oblast. Population:  The town was named after Vladimir Lenin.

History
It was founded in 1802 as the village of Prishibinskoye and was later renamed Prishib. It was renamed Leninsk in 1919 and granted town status in 1963.

Administrative and municipal status
Within the framework of administrative divisions, Leninsk serves as the administrative center of Leninsky District. As an administrative division, it is incorporated within Leninsky District as the town of district significance of Leninsk. As a municipal division, the town of district significance of Leninsk is incorporated within Leninsky Municipal District as Leninsk Urban Settlement.

References

Notes

Sources

Cities and towns in Volgograd Oblast